Cell Research is a monthly peer-reviewed scientific journal covering cell biology. It is published by the Nature Research on behalf of the Shanghai Institutes for Biological Sciences (Chinese Academy of Sciences) and is affiliated with the Chinese Society for Cell Biology. It was established in 1990. The editor-in-chief is Gang Pei (Shanghai Institutes for Biological Sciences), and the deputy editor-in-chief is Dangsheng Li (Shanghai Institutes for Biological Sciences).

Abstracting and indexing 
The journal is abstracted and indexed in:
 Index Medicus/MEDLINE/PubMed
 Science Citation Index
 Current Contents/Life Sciences
 Chemical Abstracts
 BIOSIS Previews
 VINITI Database RAS

According to the Journal Citation Reports, Cell Research has a 2021 impact factor of 46.297.

References

External links 
 
 NPG website

Molecular and cellular biology journals
Nature Research academic journals
Monthly journals
Publications established in 1990
English-language journals
Academic journals associated with learned and professional societies
Hybrid open access journals